The Gallatin Gateway Inn is a Spanish-stucco style railroad hotel at Gallatin Gateway, Montana. The hotel is one of the "Historic Inns of America." The Gallatin Gateway Inn was opened on June 18, 1927. Constructed and operated by The Milwaukee Road (Chicago, Milwaukee, St. Paul and Pacific Railroad), the luxury hotel was reached by electrified railroad branch line that connected to the Milwaukee's main line at Three Forks, Montana. It was among the first hotels in Montana with telephones in every room, and offered travelers access to Yellowstone National Park. Park buses took passengers from the hotel to the park.

It was the first hotel built and operated by the Milwaukee Road. The hotel was originally built to promote tourism on the Milwaukee Road's Olympian and Columbian passenger trains. The hotel was restored in the 1980s.  It was added to the National Register of Historic Places on January 24, 1980, a month before the Milwaukee Road left the Northwestern United States.

Following a foreclosure in February 2013, the Inn was purchased and renovated by M&M Hospitality. In 2015 the building was leased to the Yellowstone Club to provide housing for Yellowstone Club, Spanish Peaks Mountain Club and Moonlight Basin employees.

References

External links 

 Gallatin Gateway Inn

Hotel buildings on the National Register of Historic Places in Montana
Chicago, Milwaukee, St. Paul and Pacific Railroad
Railway hotels in the United States
National Register of Historic Places in Gallatin County, Montana
1927 establishments in Montana
Hotel buildings completed in 1927
Spanish Revival architecture in Montana
Mission Revival architecture in Montana